

Qualification summary
The following nations qualified:

Qualification by category

-60kg Men

-67kg Men

-75kg Men

-84kg Men

84+kg Men

-50kg Women

-55kg Women

-61kg Women

-68kg Women

-68+kg Women

  Countries may only enter athletes in which they have not qualified in.
  Open to athletes from Canada and the United States only.
  If an athlete from either Canada or the United States qualify through the Pan American Championship, the other nation automatically gets the North American spot. If both nations qualify, then the top three from the Pan American Championships will earn the spots.
  If an athlete is injured they may be replaced by another athlete from the same country.
  There has been a late change in the qualification system which the Canadian federation has appealed.
  Jesús Rodríguez of Puerto Rico had originally won the spot, but withdrew due to an injury. El Salvador's Carlos Galán will replace him.

References

External links
Results from the 2011 Pan American Championship
North American Cup results

2011 in karate
Qualification for the 2011 Pan American Games
Karate at the 2011 Pan American Games